Naphtali Wolf Tur (died 29 May 1885) was a Russian Hebraist of Jewish descent.

Born in Vilna, Tur settled in Warsaw, where he taught Hebrew and several modern languages. He was a talented poet; but, owing to his untimely death, most of his productions remained unpublished, including a collection of verse entitled Benot ha-shir. Those poems which were printed include Ha-yovel, a long poem in honour of Sir Moses Montefiore's centenary, Geveret ha-ḥeshbon, and El ha-ishah. Several of his poems were published in Avrom Ber Gotlober's Ha-boker or.

Partial bibliography

Notes

References
 

Year of birth missing
Date of birth unknown
1885 deaths
19th-century Jews
Hebrew-language poets
Jewish educators
People of the Haskalah
Writers from Vilnius
Writers from Warsaw